ESPN Radio 1260 may refer to:

 WRIE serving the Erie, PA market
 WSKO (AM) serving the Syracuse, NY market